Jurehra is a Town in Bharatpur district of Rajasthan in India.

Geography 
Jurehra town is situated between the border of Rajasthan and Haryana. It is last village of Bharatpur District as well as of Rajasthan. Its area is up to 5 km and the roads are well connected to the various cities.

Notable places

Arya samaaj jurhera, aadi gaur Brahmin colony, Badi Masjid, Lala ji ki Haveli,
Indrakuti Hanuman Mandir, Lala Ji Ka Kund,
Kaila Devi Mandir, Digambar Jain Mandir,
Ram Talai, Chaumura canal, Bagichi,Shri Krishna Niwas Khandelwals etc.

Cities and towns in Bharatpur district